The Lunacy Act 1890 (53 Vict. ch. 5) formed the basis of mental health law in England and Wales from 1890 until 1959.  It placed an obligation on local authorities to maintain institutions for the mentally ill.

References

1890 in law
United Kingdom Acts of Parliament 1890
Acts of the Parliament of the United Kingdom concerning England and Wales
Legal history of England
Mental health legal history of the United Kingdom